= Skyeye =

Slovenian heavy metal band

Skyeye, also stylized SkyEye is a Slovenian heavy metal band.

== Reception ==
Their debut album was Digital God in 2018. Rock Hard noted this as a "remarkable" iteration of classic new wave of British heavy metal.

Soldiers of Light came out in 2021 on the German label Reaper Entertainment. Metal Hammer Germany rated it a bit above average, as a 4 out of 7. Inspiration-wise, the reference was primarily Iron Maiden "with hints of Judas Priest and Saxon", and the singer Jan Lešcanec was "strikingly similar" to Bruce Dickinson in "certain registers". A drawback on the album was the lack of "absolute metal anthem euphoria"—with "earworms" being "too few and far between". Metal.de also noted "some reminiscences" of the same bands, though Skyeye was no mere copy. Skyeye had matured since 2018's Digital God and now played around with "the genre's tropes with enough confidence to distinguish themselves from the competition through strong songwriting". The entire record did not hold the same quality, but the score was 8. Rock Hard lay in the same territory with a 7.5 out of 10. Powermetal.de reached even higher with a 9. The band showed their ability "to forge gripping, irresistible metal anthems". Even in the track "Chernobyl", spanning almost fifteen minutes, Skyeye "keeps the listener engaged almost continuously – those guitar licks and runs, that powerful drumming, and not least, that voice!". A point was docked for "minor flaws".

The album New Horizons followed in 2024, this too on Reaper Entertainment. Grega Stalowsky had left the band; being the main songwriter, three of his compositions were present even though he did not play on New Horizons. The album received reserved reviews from Metal Hammer (4 of 7) and Metal.de (6 of 10). The production was noticeably improved, Metal Hammer wrote, but the songwriting and arrangements did not stand out from "typical heavy metal fare". Despite the album name, their musical horizons "seem rather limited" according to Metal.de. The reviewer found it "hard to imagine a more traditional way to celebrate metal in 2024 than on "New Horizons" without becoming pure parody". The album would however be enjoyed by "those who don't care about innovation and originality". Rock Hard went slightly up in their assessment, to 8 of 10, and Powermetal.de slightly down to 8.5. Nevertheless, the review stated that Skyeye kept getting better. Contrary to other reviewers, Powermetal.de opined that Skyeye "repeatedly surprises with song ideas that lie outside the expected spectrum".

== Discography ==
- Run for Your Life (EP, 2017)
- Digital God (2018)
- Soldiers of Light (2021, Reaper Entertainment)
- New Horizons (2024, Reaper Entertainment)
